Craig George Robinson (born August 21, 1948) is a former Major League Baseball shortstop who played for the Philadelphia Phillies (-), Atlanta Braves (-, -), and San Francisco Giants (-). He batted and threw right-handed.

Robinson was drafted by the Phillies in the 11th round of the 1970 amateur draft. He played 3 seasons in the Minor Leagues before making his Major League debut as a pinch runner at Veterans Stadium on September 9, 1972. He was traded along with Barry Lersch from the Phillies to the Braves for Ron Schueler at the Winter Meetings on December 3, 1973. A career .219 hitter, Robinson started regularly only once, playing 145 games for the 1974 Atlanta Braves.

References

External links

Baseball Reference (Minors)
Baseball Gauge
Retrosheet
Venezuelan Professional Baseball League

1948 births
Living people
American expatriate baseball players in Venezuela
Atlanta Braves players
Baseball players from Pennsylvania
Cardenales de Lara players
Eugene Emeralds players
Hawaii Islanders players
Leones del Caracas players
Major League Baseball shortstops
Minor league baseball managers
Philadelphia Phillies players
Reading Phillies players
Richmond Braves players
San Francisco Giants players
Wake Forest University alumni